Göztepe is a neighborhood in Kadıköy district of Istanbul, Turkey. The name, literally meaning "eye hill" in English, was coined to honor Gözcü Baba ("Father Watchman"), the nickname of the watchman of a dervish lodge situated on a hill there.

The neighborhood on the Asian part of Istanbul is bordered in the south by Sahilyolu (Coastline) and the Sea of Marmara, in the north by Merdivenköy, in the east by Erenköy and in the west by Çiftehavuzlar neighborhoods.

The notable high street of the Asian part of Istanbul, the Baghdad Avenue, runs through Göztepe. The city park of Göztepe is the largest green area along Baghdad Avenue covering .

History
The neighborhood developed in the late Ottoman times during the reign of Sultan Abdul Hamid II (1876-1909) as a residence area for high court officials. In the western part of the area, wealthy Levantines and other non-Muslims settled. Wooden mansions within lavish gardens were built in Göztepe and around. At the suburb, there were also farms and dairies, which supplied the court with their products as well.

Göztepe railway station is the fourth stop from Haydarpaşa Terminal on the commuter line of Haydarpaşa-Gebze. Its opening followed the establishment of the Baghdad Railway, and contributed to further settlement in the area.

In the first half of the 20th century, the area was populated as a summer resort mostly. While many of the historic wooden mansions made place for modern buildings following fires, a small number of them still exist.

After the construction of the highway  passing through north of Göztepe, the neighborhood grew into that direction in the meadows.

Education
 Göztepe İhsan Kurşunoğlu Anadolu High School
 Erenköy Girls High School
 Yeşilbahar Middle School (Closed)
 Göztepe Elementary School
 İlhami Ahmed Örnekal Elementary School
 Fenerbahçe Anadolu High School
 Kadıköy Göztepe Mesleki ve Teknik Anadolu High School
 Faik Reşit Unat Middle School
 Ali Haydar Ersoy Middle School
 İstanbul Avni Akyol Fine Arts High School
 Kadıköy Bilim ve Sanat Merkezi

Places of interest
 Istanbul Toy Museum founded and run by poet and writer Sunay Akın.
 Göztepe railway station
 Selamiçeşme Özgürlük Park
 Göztepe Park
 Göztepe Marketplace (Göztepe Sabit Pazarı)
 Tütüncü Mehmet Efendi Mosque
 Caddebostan Synagogue
 Göztepe Sports Facilities
 Hilal S.K.
 Erenköy Fire station

Transport
 Göztepe railway station
 GZ1 Public transport bus service
 GZ2 Public transport bus service
Metro
M4 Kadıköy-Kartal (extension to Sabiha Gökçen International Airport is under construction)

References

Neighbourhoods of Kadıköy